Sigmaringen is a railway station in the town of Sigmaringen, located in the Sigmaringen district in Baden-Württemberg, Germany. The station lies on the Tübingen–Sigmaringen railway, the Ulm–Sigmaringen railway and the Engstingen–Sigmaringen railway. The train services are operated by DB Regio Baden-Württemberg and SWEG Südwestdeutsche Landesverkehrs-AG.

History 
The planning of the station building took place in 1870 and the completion of the building took place in 1873.

References 

Railway stations in Baden-Württemberg
Buildings and structures in Sigmaringen (district)
Railway stations in Germany opened in 1873